Lee Kelly (May 24, 1932 – March 28, 2022) was an American sculptor who has more than 30 sculptures on display between Eugene, Oregon, and Vancouver, Washington. Kelly has been called "Oregon's sculptor".

Personal life
Born in rural McCall in central Idaho, Kelly was raised near Riggins, Idaho. His family moved to Portland in 1945 and he attended Roosevelt High School. From 1949 to 1951, he attended Vanport Extension Center, which is now Portland State University. From 1951 to 1955, he was in the United States Air Force Reserves at Portland Air Force Base, including service on active duty. He married Jeanette Bernhardt. During the late 1950s he attended Pacific Northwest College of Art in Portland, Oregon. From 1967 to 1971, he taught at Mt. Angel College, Mt. Angel, Oregon. Bernhardt and Kelly had one daughter Kassandra, and Bernhardt died in 1960 of cancer before Kassandra turned one.

In 1961, Kelly married Bonnie Bronson, and in 1963 they bought a  dairy farm near Oregon City, where as of 2010 Kelly still lived. Kelly and Bronson had a son, Jason, who died in 1978 of leukemia, while Bronson died climbing Mount Adams with Kelly in 1990. Kelly died at his home in Clackamas County on March 28, 2022.

See also

 List of works by Lee Kelly

References

External links

Lee Kelly at Elizabeth Leach Gallery
Metal Sculptor Lee Kelly, Oregon Art Beat, Oregon Public Broadcasting (2007)
 Exploring The World Of Oregon Sculptor Lee Kelly, Oregon Public Broadcasting (2017)
Oral history interview with Lee Kelly, 1987 August 18

1932 births
2022 deaths
20th-century American sculptors
21st-century American sculptors
American male sculptors
American contemporary artists
Artists from Idaho
Military personnel from Idaho
Military personnel from Oregon
Pacific Northwest College of Art alumni
People from Oregon City, Oregon
People from McCall, Idaho
Portland State University alumni
Roosevelt High School (Oregon) alumni
Sculptors from Oregon
United States Air Force airmen
United States Air Force reservists
20th-century American male artists